Prayer beads are a form of beadwork used to count the repetitions of prayers, chants, or mantras by members of various religions such as Hinduism, Buddhism, Shinto, Umbanda, Islam, Sikhism, the Baháʼí Faith, and some Christian denominations, such as the Roman Catholic Church, the Lutheran Church, the Oriental Orthodox Churches, and the Eastern Orthodox Churches. Common forms of beaded devotion include the mequteria in Oriental Orthodox Christianity, the chotki in Eastern Orthodox Christianity, the Wreath of Christ in Lutheran Christianity, the Dominican rosary of the Blessed Virgin Mary in Roman Catholic Christianity, the dhikr (remembrance of God) in Islam, the japamala in Buddhism and Hinduism, and the Jaap Sahib in Sikhism.

Origins and etymology 
Beads are among the earliest human ornaments and ostrich shell beads in Africa date to 10,000 BC. Over the centuries various cultures have made beads from a variety of material from stone and shells to clay.

The English word bead derives from the Old English noun bede which means a prayer. The oldest image of a string of beads in a religious context and resembling a string of prayer beads is found on the fresco of the "Adorants" (or "Worshipers") at the Xeste 3 building of the prehistoric settlement of Akrotiri, Santorini (Thera,) Greece (Wall Paintings of Thera.) dating from the 17th c. BC (c. 1613 BC.)  It was used in Hindu Prayers and meditation Hindu prayers in India. Buddhism later on adopted this custom. As the Ancient Hindus migrated towards West Asia this practice was carried to many parts of the world and became a part of different religions. The statue of a Hindu holy man with beads dates to the third century BC.

Structure 

The number of beads varies by religion or use. Islamic prayer beads, called Misbaha or Tasbih, usually have 100 beads (99 +1 = 100 beads in total or 33 beads read thrice and +1). Buddhists and Hindus use the Japa Mala, which usually has 108 beads, or 27 which are counted four times. Baháʼí prayer beads consist of either 95 beads or 19 beads, which are strung with the addition of five beads below. The Sikh Mala also has 108 beads.

The oldest set of prayer beads in Western Christianity, the Pater Noster cord, traditionally contains 150 beads for the 150 Psalms in the Bible, though Pater Noster cords of 50 beads have been made that are prayed through thrice. Roman Catholics came to use the Rosary (Latin "rosarium", meaning "rose garden") with 59 beads. The Oriental Orthodox mequteria, chiefly used by Coptic Orthodox Christians and Ethiopian Orthodox Christians, contains 41 beads for praying the Kyrie Eleison said during the 41 metanoias (prostrations) in each of the Christian seven fixed prayer times (cf. Agpeya breviary). Eastern Orthodox Christians use a knotted prayer rope called either a komboskini or chotki, with 100 knots, although prayer ropes with 50 or 33 knots can also be used. The Lutheran Wreath of Christ contains 18 beads. In the 1980s Rev. Lynn Bauman from the Protestant Episcopal Church in the United States of America introduced Anglican prayer beads with 33 beads.

The Greek "komboloi" (which are worry beads and have no religious purpose) has an odd number of beads—usually one more than a multiple of four, e.g. (4x4)+1, (5x4)+1.

Use 
Since the beads are fingered in an automatic manner, they allow the user to keep track of how many prayers have been said with a minimal amount of conscious effort, which in turn allows greater attention to the prayer itself.

Judaism 
Although the use of prayer beads grew within those religions, it did not enter Judaism, perhaps because of its association with other religions, and to date Judaism does not use prayer beads. Although not used as counting device, many Jews touch the knots on the tzitzits attached to their tallit (prayer shawl) at specific points in their prayers.

Christianity 

The Desert Fathers of the 3rd to 5th centuries, used pebbles or knotted ropes to count prayers, typically the Jesus Prayer ("Lord Jesus Christ, Son of God, have mercy on me, a sinner"). The invention is attributed to Anthony the Great or his associate Pachomius the Great in the 4th century. In Vita of Saint Paul of Thebes (227 A.D. to 342 A.D.), written by Saint Jerome (347 A.D. to 420 A.D.) it states that Saint Paul of Thebes used pebbles and knotted cord to count prayers.

Around the 8th century, Paternoster cords were used to count the 150 Psalms of the Bible, but for those who could not read, they were used to count 150 recitations of the Lord's Prayer. The Catholic Encyclopedia thus mentions strings of beads, presumably for prayer, found in the tombs of Saint Gertrude of Nivelles (7th century) and Saint Norbert and Saint Rosalia (12th century). A more explicit reference is that in 1125 William of Malmesbury mentioned a string of gems that Lady Godiva used to count prayers. The oldest prayer beads to be found in Britain were discovered by archaeologists on Lindisfarne in 2022: made of salmon vertebrae, they date from the 8th or 9th century.

Roman Catholics came to pray the Dominican rosary with strings of 59 beads. The term rosary comes from the Latin rosarium "rose garden" and is an important and traditional devotion of the Catholic Church, combining prayer and meditation in sequences (called "decades") of the Lord's Prayer, 10 Hail Marys, and a Gloria Patri as well as a number of other prayers (such as the Apostles' Creed and the Salve Regina) at the beginning and end. The prayers are accompanied by meditation on the Mysteries, events in the life and ministry of Jesus. This traditional Catholic form of the rosary is attributed to Saint Dominic, though some Catholic writers have doubted this claim. Catholic rosary beads are composed of crucifix and center which can be made of sterling silver and/or gold, and beads which are usually made of glass, amethyst, rose quartz stone, crystal, black onyx, lavender glass or pearl, but all parts can be made of any material.  Catholics also use prayer beads to pray chaplets.

In Oriental Orthodox Christianity, especially among Ethiopian Christians and Coptic Christians, prayer beads known as the mequetaria/mequteria employ numbers such as 41, 64, and 100 as their length; the mequetaria is chiefly used for reciting the Kyrie Eleison (Lord have mercy) during the seven fixed prayer times of Christianity. In regards to the first two numbers, the former represent the number of wounds inflicted on Jesus from lashing, the nails, and the lance while the latter represents Mary's age upon her Assumption.

The Eastern Orthodox Church uses prayer ropes that usually come with 33, 50 or 100 knots.  The loops of knotted wool (or occasionally of beads), called chotki or komboskini to pray the Jesus Prayer. Among Russian Old Believers, a prayer rope made of leather, called 'lestovka', is more common, although this type is no longer commonly used now by the Russian Orthodox Church. According to the Catholic Encyclopedia, "The rosary is conferred upon the Greek Orthodox monk as a part of his investiture with the mandyas or full monastic habit, as the second step in monastic life, and is called his 'spiritual sword'." 

The Lutheran Wreath of Christ, invented by Martin Lönnebo, Bishop Emeritus of the Diocese of Linköping of the Swedish Lutheran Church, is a set of 18 beads, some round and some elongated, arranged in an irregular pattern. Each one has its own significance as a stimulus and reminder for meditation, although they can also be used for repetitive prayer.

In the mid-1980s, Anglican prayer beads were developed in the Protestant Episcopal Church in the United States, originating in the Diocese of Texas. The set consists of 33 beads (representing the 33 years of the life of Christ) arranged in four groupings of symbolic significance. 

While there are liturgical churches using prayer beads in prayer, non-liturgical Christian churches do not use them.

Islam 

In Islam, prayer beads are referred to as Misbaha (Arabic: مسبحة mas'baha ), Tasbih or Sibha and contain 99 normal-sized beads, (corresponding to the Names of God in Islam) and two smaller or mini beads separating every 33 beads. Sometimes only 33 beads are used, in which case one would cycle through them three times. The beads are traditionally used to keep count while saying the prayer. The prayer is considered a form of dhikr that involves the repetitive utterances of short sentences in the praise and glorification of Allah, in Islam. The prayer is recited as follows: 33 times "Subhan Allah" (Glory be to God), 33 times "Al-hamdu lilah" (Praise be to God), and 34 times "Allahu Akbar" (God is the greatest) which equals 100, the number of beads in the misbaha.

To keep track of counting either the phalanges of the right hand or a misbaha is used. Use of the misbaha to count prayers and recitations is considered an acceptable practice within mainstream Islam. While they are widely used today in Sunni and Shia Islam, adherents of the Salafi sects shun them as an intolerable innovation.

In the Ahmadiyya, misbaha and other forms of prayer beads are considered an "innovation". According to Mirza Tahir Ahmad of the Ahmadiyya community, the use of prayer beads is a form of innovation which was not practised by the early Muslim community

Sikhism 

Sikh worshipers may use mala (prayer beads) while reciting verses from the Guru Granth Sahib. These prayer beads may be used as a part of the Sikh attire and worn around turbans or wrists. This is also known as a simranee.

Hinduism 

An early use of prayer beads can be traced to Hinduism where they are called japamala. Japa is the repeating of the name of a deity or a mantra.  Mala means "garland" or "wreath".

Japamala are used for repetition of a mantra, for other forms of sādhanā or "spiritual exercise" and as an aid to meditation. The most common mala have 108 beads. The most common materials used for making the beads are Rudraksha seeds (used by Shaivites) and Ocimum tenuiflorum (tulsi) stems (used by Vaishnavites).

According to Vedic scriptures 103 beads were used during Treta Yuga, 108 beads during Dvapara Yuga, and 111 beads in Kali Yuga.

According  to Hindu Sashtras there must be 108 beads. Generally for meditation rudraksha beads, Lotus seed are used.

Buddhism 

Prayer beads ((yeomju)) are also used in many forms of Mahayana Buddhism, often with a lesser number of beads (usually a divisor of 108). In Pure Land Buddhism, for instance, 27-bead malas are common. These shorter malas are sometimes called "prostration rosaries" because they are easier to hold when enumerating repeated prostrations. In Tibetan Buddhism malas are also 108 beads: one mala counts as 100 mantras, and the eight extra are meant to be dedicated to all sentient beings (the practice as a whole is dedicated at its end as well). In Tibetan Buddhism, often larger malas are used; for example, malas of 111 beads. When counting, they calculate one mala as 100 mantras and the 11 additional beads are taken as extra to compensate for errors.

Various type of materials are used to make mala beads such as seeds of the rudraksha, beads made from the wood of the tulsi plant, animal bone, wood or seeds from the Bodhi Tree (a particularly sacred tree of the species Ficus religiosa) or of Nelumbo nucifera (the lotus plant). Semi-precious stones like carnelian and amethyst are also used. Another commonly used material is sandalwood.

Bahá’í Faith 
The Baháʼí Faith stipulates that the verse Alláh-u-Abhá "God the All-Glorious" be recited 95 times daily after the performance of ablutions. To help facilitate this recitation Bahá’ís often use prayer beads, though they are not required to.  Most commonly, Bahá’í prayer beads consist of 95 individual beads on a strand or a strand of 19 beads with 5 set counters.  In the latter case, the person reciting the verses typically tracks the 19 individual verses in a set with one hand and tracks the sets of verses with the other (19 verses times 5 sets for a total of 95 total verses).  Bahá’í prayer beads are made of any number of natural and man-made materials including glass, precious and semi-precious stones, various metals and wood.  There are no traditions regarding the structure of the prayer bead strand or the materials used.

Materials used for making prayer beads

Seeds and fruitstones 
 Abrus precatorius
 Afzelia species
 Choerospondias axillaris
 Dracontomelon dao
 Rudraksha
 Vyjanti

Gems and precious stones
 Pearls
 Rose Quartz
 Amethyst
 Lava stone
 Onyx
 Amber

See also 
 Prayer rope
 Worry beads

References

Bibliography 

 Dubin, L.S. (2009). Prayer Beads. In C. Kenney (Ed.), The History of Beads: From 100,000 B.C. to the Present (Revised and Expanded Edition) (pp. 79–92). New York: Abrams Publishing.
 Henry, G., & Marriott, S. (2008). Beads of Faith: Pathways to Meditation and Spirituality Using Rosaries, Prayer Beads and Sacred Words. Fons Vitae Publishing.
 Untracht, O. (2008). Rosaries of India. In H. Whelchel (Ed.), Traditional Jewelry of India (pp. 69–73). New York: Thames & Hudson, Inc.
 Wiley, E., & Shannon, M.O. (2002). A String and a Prayer: How to Make and Use Prayer Beads. Red Wheel/Weiser, LLC.
 Winston, K. (2008). Bead One, Pray Too: A Guide to Making and Using Prayer Beads. Morehouse Publishing.
prayer beads.

External links 

 Anthropology of beads Museum of Anthropology, University of Missouri